Darreh-ye Bani Yab Bahram Beygi (also Romanized as Darreh-ye Banī Yāb Bahrām Beygī; also known as Darreh-ye Banī Yāb) is a village in Pataveh Rural District, Pataveh District, Dana County, Kohgiluyeh and Boyer-Ahmad Province, Iran. At the 2006 census, its population was 149, in 30 families.

References 

Populated places in Dana County